Anchorage Gateway is a 101 m (331 ft) tall, 29-storey residential skyscraper in Salford Quays, Greater Manchester, England. It was designed by Chapman Taylor, with Jon Matthews Architects as the delivery architect. As of March 2023 it is structurally topped out, the fourth-tallest building in Salford and the 17th-tallest building in Greater Manchester.

History

Planning
The developer Cole Waterhouse purchased the site from COIF Charities Property Fund in August 2019. It was previously home to The Anchorage, a four-storey 1990s office building that had been occupied by Barclays.

Planning approval was obtained in November 2019.

Planning approval was granted in October 2020.

Construction
Construction of Anchorage Gateway commenced in 2021 and the building was structurally topped out as of March 2023. The tower comprises 29-storeys, made up of ground, mezzanine and 27 levels of build to rent apartments. It is anticipated to open in December 2023.

Facilities
The tower also includes co-working spaces, a screening room, landscaped podium garden, roof terrace, private dining suite and fitness studio.

Anchorage tram stop on the Eccles Line of the Metrolink system is located opposite Anchorage Gateway.

See also
List of tallest buildings in the United Kingdom
List of tallest buildings and structures in Greater Manchester

References

Buildings and structures in Salford
Unfinished buildings and structures